Lindera is a monotypic moth genus in the family Tineidae described by Blanchard in 1854. Its only species, Lindera tessellatella, was described by the same author two years earlier. It is a widely distributed species, which was first described from South America, but has been recorded from Africa, Europe, North America, Australia, New Zealand, Fiji and Hawaii.

The wingspan is 20–30 mm. The forewings are glossy, grey brown, with a speckled darker pattern. The scales of the head are directed forward over the vertex and down the frons.

The larvae feed on detritus, stored food products and arthropod remains.

References

External links

Hantsmoths

Tineidae
Monotypic moth genera
Moths described in 1852
Moths of Africa
Moths of New Zealand
Taxa named by Émile Blanchard